Bato may refer to:

People
Bato (Illyrian name)
 Bato (Dardanian chieftain) (fl. 206–176 BCE), chieftain of the Dardani in Illyria
 Bato (Daesitiate chieftain) (fl. 35 BCE – 9 CE), chieftain of the Daesitiates in Illyria
 Bato (Breucian chieftain) (fl. 8 CE), chieftain of the Breuci in Illyria

 Bato Govedarica (1928–2006), American basketball player
 István Bató (1812–1890), prominent citizen of the Hungarian city of Miskolc
 Ronald dela Rosa (born 1962), nicknamed "Bato", former Director General of the Philippine National Police and now a senator

Places
 Bato or Vato, a small mountain town in Burma, site of a battle in the Burma Campaign
 Bato, Tochigi, Japan, now part of Nakagawa

Philippines
 Bato, Camarines Sur
 Bato, Catanduanes
 Bato, Leyte
 Lake Bato, Camarines Sur

Other uses
 Bato, a character from the TV series Avatar: The Last Airbender
 Bato, Bato, a 1984 studio album by Bosnian singer Lepa Brena
 Bato (culture), pre-Columbian culture of the present Central Chile; for example, see El Quisco
 Bato, a name given to the Dutch ship Staaten Generaal in 1798